Tituba of Salem Village is a 1964 children's novel by African-American writer Ann Petry about the 17th-century West Indian slave of the same name who was the first to be accused of practicing witchcraft during the 1692 Salem witch trials. Written for children 10 and up, it portrays Tituba as a black West Indian woman who tells stories about life in Barbados to the village girls. These stories are mingled with existing superstitions and half-remembered pagan beliefs on the part of Puritans, and the witchcraft hysteria is partly attributed to a sort of cabin fever during a particularly bitter winter. Petry's portrayal of the helplessness of women in that period, particularly slaves and indentured servants, is key to understanding her view of the Tituba legend.

See also

The Street
Tituba

1964 American novels
1964 children's books
American children's novels
Children's historical novels
Salem witch trials in fiction
African-American novels
Novels by Ann Petry